Storm Brendan may refer to:

 Typhoon Brendan (1991), developed in the Pacific, struck China
 Tropical Storm Brendan (1994), developed in the Philippine Sea, struck Japan and Korea
 Storm Brendan in the 2019–20 European windstorm season